Serenade Cove is a private housing estate in Tsuen Wan West, Tsuen Wan, New Territories, Hong Kong, near Belvedere Garden and Bayview Garden. It consists of 3 high-rise buildings developed by Wharf Holdings in 2001.

Politics
Serenade Cove is located in Tsuen Wan West constituency of the Tsuen Wan District Council. It was formerly represented by Angus Yick Shing-chung, who was elected in the 2019 elections until July 2021.

References

Buildings and structures completed in 2001
Private housing estates in Hong Kong
Tsuen Wan West
The Wharf (Holdings)